Patrick Wyatt is a game programmer and one of the three co-founders of ArenaNet. He was the leader of the Network and Technology teams and a programmer for Guild Wars. Before the founding of ArenaNet, he was working in Blizzard Entertainment where he was the Vice President of Research and Development and a senior programmer. Wyatt was the leader of Battle.net gaming network's programming and a major contributor on the multiplayer parts of Blizzard's popular games including StarCraft, Diablo and Warcraft II: Tides of Darkness. Having been in Blizzard for more than eight years, his work also includes earlier Blizzard games like Lost Vikings and Rock N' Roll Racing.

On February 24, 2010, he became the Chief Operations Officer for En Masse Entertainment, along with other industry veterans. The first official En Masse title, an MMORPG titled TERA, launched in 2011 in South Korea and 2012 in North America and Europe.

Patrick was employed by Undead Labs on January 30, 2014, where he worked with Jeff Strain, another co-founder of ArenaNet.

As of November 2015 he is now Senior Principal Engineer for Amazon Games.

Games

Programmer of Game Ports
The Lost Vikings (1992), Interplay Productions
Battle Chess Enhanced CD-ROM (1992), Interplay Productions
Rock 'n Roll Racing (1993), Interplay Productions
The Death and Return of Superman (1994), Sun Corporation of America
Blackthorne* (1994), Interplay Productions
Justice League Task Force (1995), Acclaim Entertainment
The Lost Vikings 2 (1997), Interplay Entertainment

Producer and Lead Programmer 
WarCraft: Orcs & Humans (1994), Blizzard Entertainment
Warcraft II: Tides of Darkness (1995), Blizzard Entertainment
StarCraft (1998), Blizzard Entertainment

Programmer
Diablo (1996), Blizzard Entertainment
Warcraft II: The Dark Saga (1997), Electronic Arts
Warcraft II: Battle.net Edition (2000), Blizzard Entertainment
Diablo II (2000), Blizzard Entertainment
StarCraft: Brood War (1998), Blizzard Entertainment
StarCraft 64 (2000), Nintendo of America
Warcraft III: Reign of Chaos (2002), Blizzard Entertainment

Production/Business
 Guild Wars: Nightfall (2006), NCsoft Europe
 Guild Wars: Factions (2006), NCsoft Europe
 Guild Wars: Eye of the North (2007), NCsoft Europe
 Aion (2009), NCsoft West
 TERA (2011), NHN Games Corporation

References

External links
 

American video game programmers
American video game designers
Living people
Year of birth missing (living people)
American chief operating officers
Blizzard Entertainment people